Meanings of Stepless include:

 Stepless access, e.g. in a Low-floor tram
 Stepless (aircraft), an aircraft design
 Stepless automatic transmission, e.g. Variomatic